Lamellibrachia barhami is a large pogonophore.

Description

Its tentacular crown is formed of several, fused, horseshoe-shaped tentacle lamellae. The second segment has two body folds, near which open the genital ducts. The trunk, which comprises 89% of its total body length, is undifferentiated.  The true metasoma is without setae. The heart is a simple muscular elaboration of the anterior end of the ventral blood vessel. The brain is large, and from it arises a pair of intraepidermal nerve cords, which extend the full length of the vestimental region; thereafter, they join and form the a nerve cord of the trunk. Associated with the brain and the nerve cords are the dorsal tubes.

References

Further reading
Kiel, Steffen, ed. The Vent and Seep Biota: Aspects from Microbes to Ecosystems. Vol. 33. Springer, 2010.
MacLeod, C. J., Paul A. Tyler, and C. L. Walker, eds. "Tectonic, magmatic, hydrothermal and biological segmentation of mid-ocean ridges." Geological Society of London, 1996.
Beesley, Pamela L., Graham JB Ross, and Christopher J. Glasby, eds.Polychaetes & allies: the southern synthesis. Vol. 4. CSIRO publishing, 2000.
Van Dover, Cindy. The ecology of deep-sea hydrothermal vents. Princeton University Press, 2000.
Sigvaldadóttir, Elín, Andrew SY Mackie, and Gudmundur V. Helgason, eds.Advances in Polychaete Research. Vol. 170. Springer, 2003.

External links

Sabellida
Animals described in 1969